Si Mohamed Ketbi  (born 27 December 1997) is a Belgian taekwondo athlete. 

He represented his country at the 2016 Summer Olympics in Rio de Janeiro, in the men's 58 kg.

In 2017, he competed in the men's featherweight event at the 2017 World Taekwondo Championships held in Muju, South Korea.

References

External links
 

1997 births
Living people
Belgian male taekwondo practitioners
Olympic taekwondo practitioners of Belgium
Taekwondo practitioners at the 2016 Summer Olympics
Taekwondo practitioners at the 2014 Summer Youth Olympics
Taekwondo practitioners at the 2015 European Games
European Games medalists in taekwondo
European Games bronze medalists for Belgium
World Taekwondo Championships medalists
21st-century Belgian people